In boxing, a triple champion is a boxer who has won world titles in three weight classes. For most of the 20th century it was a remarkable and rare achievement accomplished by only a handful of fighters. Beginning in the 1970s, triple champions have become increasingly more common due to the proliferation of weight classes and sanctioning bodies in the sport. Bob Fitzsimmons was boxing's first triple champion, successively winning the middleweight, heavyweight and light-heavyweight titles between 1894 and 1903.

Early history

The first triple champion of boxing was Bob Fitzsimmons when he added the light-heavyweight title to his middleweight and heavyweight titles on November 25, 1903.

Barney Ross was the first boxer to simultaneously hold world titles in two different weight classes when he won the 135-pound lightweight and 140-pound light-welterweight titles against Tony Canzoneri on June 23, 1933. Later Ross won the 147-pound welterweight world title from Jimmy McLarnin on May 28, 1934.

Henry Armstrong was the first man to hold three titles in three divisions simultaneously. He won the featherweight world title from Petey Sarron on October 29, 1937, the welterweight world title from Barney Ross on May 31, 1938, and the lightweight world title in his next fight, on August 17 against Lou Ambers. Armstrong then immediately vacated the featherweight world title because he could no longer make the weight.

Wilfred Benítez was the youngest ever champion at any weight. Benitez first won the 140-pound WBA light-welterweight title from Antonio Cervantes on March 6, 1976, at the age of 17.  He moved up in weight to win the 147-pound WBC welterweight title from Carlos Palomino on January 14, 1979, and finally won a third title when he added the 154-pound WBC light-middleweight title from Maurice Hope on May 23, 1981.

Recognition

Major sanctioning bodies
There is some dispute on which sanctioning bodies are considered "major" enough to be deemed legitimate world championships. The "Big Four" sanctioning bodies are always included:
World Boxing Association (WBA) - founded in 1921 (as the National Boxing Association)
World Boxing Council (WBC) - founded in 1963
International Boxing Federation (IBF) - founded in 1976
World Boxing Organization (WBO) - founded in 1988

The Ring
The Ring, boxing's most respected magazine, has awarded world championships in professional boxing within each weight class from its foundation in 1922 until the 1990s, and again since 2001. The Ring champions were, at one point, considered the linear reign to the throne, the man who beat the man. The lineal champion is also known as the true champion of the division. The Ring stopped awarding world titles in the 1990s but began again in 2002.

In 2002, The Ring created a championship system that is "intended to reward fighters who, by satisfying rigid criteria, can justify a claim as the true and only world champion in a given weight class." The Ring claims to be more authoritative and open than the sanctioning bodies' rankings, with a page devoted to full explanations for ranking changes. A fighter pays no sanctioning fees to defend or fight for the title at stake, contrary to practices of the sanctioning bodies. There are currently only two ways that a boxer can win The Rings title: defeat the reigning champion; or win a box-off between The Rings number-one and number-two rated contenders (or, sometimes, number-one and number-three rated). There are also only three ways that a boxer can lose The Rings title: lose a championship fight, move to a different weight class, or retire.
In May 2012, citing the number of vacancies in various weight classes as primary motivation, The Ring unveiled a new championship policy. Under the new policy, The Ring title can be awarded when the No. 1 and No. 2 ranked fighters face one another or when the No. 1 and 2 contenders choose not to fight one another and either of them fights No. 3, No. 4 or No. 5, the winner may be awarded The Ring title. In addition, there are now six ways for a fighter to lose his title: lose a fight in his championship weight class; move to another weight class; not schedule a fight in any weight class for 18 months; not schedule a fight in his championship weight class for 18 months, even if fighting at another weight class; not scheduling a fight with a top 5 contender in any weight class for two years; or retiring.
Many media outlets and members are extremely critical of the new championship policy and state that if this new policy is followed The Ring title will lose the credibility it once held.

Lineal
The Transnational Boxing Rankings Board (TBRB) lists a version of the lineal championship in their rankings. TBRB lists a champion when their two top-ranked fighters in any division meet and currently recognizes legitimate world champions or "true champions" in each weight classes. The Board was formed to continue where The Ring "left off" in the aftermath of its purchase by Golden Boy Promotions in 2007 and the following dismissal of Nigel Collins. After the new editors announced a controversial new championship policy in May 2012, three prominent members of the Ring Advisory Panel resigned. These three members (Springs Toledo, Cliff Rold and Tim Starks) became the founding members of the Transnational Boxing Rankings Board, which was formed over the summer of 2012 with the assistance of Stewart Howe of England.

Since 2012, a version of lineal champions is predetermined by the Transnational Boxing Rankings Board, which promotes the concept of a singular world champion per weight class. Another version of lineal champions are listed on the Cyber Boxing Zone website which list lineal champions of the Queensberry Era to date.

Minor sanctioning bodies
They are:  International Boxing Organization (IBO), World Professional Boxing Federation (WPBF), International Boxing Association (IBA), International Boxing Council (IBC), International Boxing Board (IBB), International Boxing League (IBL), International Boxing Union (IBU), Global Boxing Association (GBA), Global Boxing Council (GBC), Global Boxing Federation GBF, Global Boxing Organization (GBO), Global Boxing Union (GBU), National Boxing Association (NBA), Transcontinental World Boxing Association (TWBA), Universal Boxing Association (UBA), Universal Boxing Council (UBC), Universal Boxing Federation (UBF), Universal Boxing Organization (UBO), UNIBOX, United States Boxing Council (USBC), World Athletic Association (WAA), World Boxing Board (WBB), World Boxing Championship Committee (WBCC), World Boxing Foundation (WBFo), World Boxing Institute (WBI), World Boxing League (WBL), World Boxing Network (WBN), World Boxing Union (WBU).

Note:

 The International Boxing Association (IBA) is not to be confused with the International Boxing Association(AIBA), a French acronym for Association Internationale de Boxe Amateur, which sanctions amateur matches.
 The National Boxing Association (NBA) was established in 1984 and is not to be confused with the original National Boxing Association that was established in 1921 and changed its name to World Boxing Association (WBA) in 1962.

List of men's triple champions

The following is a list of triple champions who have held titles from one or more of the "Big Four" organizations (WBA, WBC, IBF, WBO) and The Ring. 

WBA has four recognized world champions, Super, Undisputed, Unified and Regular. The highest tier title is considered the primary champion of the division. Only boxers who are in the primary champion lineage are listed.

The ranking of WBA's primary champions are as follows:Super/UndisputedUnifiedRegularOther former international/national-world boxing commissions and organizations from the beginning of boxing are also included here:
 New York State Athletic Commission  (NYSAC)
 National Boxing Association (NBA) - changed its name to World Boxing Association (WBA) in 1962

 Note 
Dates in bold format signify the date when they won their 3rd division title. 
Interim titles are not included unless it gets promoted to the official title.
Any WBA titles won before the titles are fragmented in the division are not marked as Super, Undisputed, Unified, or Regular.
In August 2021, the WBA has started recognizing a single champion per division as part of their title reduction plan. World titles won after the plan will not be marked as Regular.

List of women's triple champions

The following is a list of women's triple champions who have held titles from one or more of the "Big Four" organizations (WBA, WBC, IBF, WBO) and The Ring.

Note 
Dates in bold format signify the date when they won their 3rd division title. 
Interim titles are not included unless they get promoted to the official champion.

List of three division champions in the original eight weight classes 
This exclusive list features boxers that are three division champions based on the original eight weight classes. A feat where only a few boxers have achieved. The Original Eight weight classes are as follows: 

Flyweight (112)
Bantamweight (118)
Featherweight (126)
Lightweight (135)
Welterweight (147)
Middleweight (160)
Light heavyweight (175)
Heavyweight (200+)

Men's Boxing

Women's Boxing

Note
Dates in bold format signify the date when they won their 3rd division title.

See also
List of current world boxing champions
List of boxing quadruple champions
List of boxing quintuple champions
List of boxing sextuple champions
List of boxing septuple champions
Octuple champion
List of WBA world champions
List of WBC world champions
List of IBF world champions
List of WBO world champions
List of The Ring world champions

Other references
Bob Fitsimmons:Boxing's First Triple World Champion 
Bob Fitzsimmons's article 
Henry Armstrong  
Tony Canzoneri 
Alexis Argüello, The Explosive Thin Man... 
The iron men of boxing 
Manny Pacquiao

References

External links
 Boxrec.com -title search
 andworldboxing 
 Boxing Records
 Saddoboxing
 Yahoo - Boxing
 IBHOF
 Cyberboxingzone
 Transnational Boxing Rankings Board
 Steve Dimitry's Heavyweight Boxing History
 The Top 20 Junior Bantamweights of All-Time/BoxingScene

3